Yakamia is an inner suburb of Albany.  The suburb was created in the 1970s, and was gazetted in 1979. The name is believed to be a Noongar word meaning "sister to a small creek".

Geography 
Yakamia is bounded by North Road to the south, Chester Pass Road to the west, Hudson and Bond Roads to the north and Ulster Road to the southeast. Yakamia Creek runs through the suburb.

Facilities 
Yakamia is a residential suburb, and used to consist primarily of bushland, however, this has slowly disappeared with the bush making way for new housing developments.  The suburb contains Yakamia Primary School, which opened in 1970 and now has around 620 students. There is also a small shopping centre on North Road. The City of Albany's council offices are located in Yakamia along North Road.

References 

Suburbs of Albany, Western Australia